Villar-Loubière is a commune in the Hautes-Alpes department in southeastern France.

Geography

Climate
Villar-Loubière has a humid continental climate (Köppen climate classification Dfb).

Population

See also
Communes of the Hautes-Alpes department

References

Communes of Hautes-Alpes